Dimesone is a synthetic glucocorticoid corticosteroid.

References

Diketones
Diols
Fluoroarenes
Glucocorticoids
Pregnanes